Fordia ophirensis is a species of legume in the family Fabaceae. It is endemic to Peninsular Malaysia. It is threatened by habitat loss.

References

Millettieae
Endemic flora of Peninsular Malaysia
Vulnerable plants
Taxonomy articles created by Polbot